Saint Vincent Academy (SVA), is a four-year, Catholic, college preparatory school for women located on West Market Street in Newark, New Jersey, United States. It operates under the supervision of the Sisters of Charity of Saint Elizabeth. The school has been accredited by the Middle States Association of Colleges and Schools Commission on Secondary School since 1990.

As of the 2017–18 school year, the school had an enrollment of 248 students and 26.5 classroom teachers (on an FTE basis), for a student–teacher ratio of 9.4:1. The school's student body was 58.9% (146) Black, 19.4% (48) White, 12.9% (32) Hispanic, 5.2% (13) two or more races and 2.8% (7) Asian.

Background
The academy was founded in 1869 by the Sisters of Charity of Saint Elizabeth, and named for St. Vincent de Paul. Saint Vincent Academy currently holds the distinction of being the only private high school for women in the city of Newark in New Jersey. The current administrative team consists of Sister June Favata, S.C. Sr. Margaret Killough, S.C., and Ms. Mary F. Nolan. This school has one of the highest graduation rates of any school in Newark and Essex County. Down the street from Saint Vincent Academy is Science Park High School, Essex County College, American History High School, Saint Benedict's Preparatory School and next to Newark Arts High School.

Athletics
The Saint Vincent Academy Panthers compete in the Super Essex Conference, which was established following a reorganization of sports leagues in Northern New Jersey by the New Jersey State Interscholastic Athletic Association (NJSIAA). With 366 students in grades 10-12, the school was classified by the NJSIAA for the 2019–20 school year as Non-Public B for most athletic competition purposes, which included schools with an enrollment of 37 to 366 students in that grade range (equivalent to Group II for public schools).

References

External links
Official homepage

1869 establishments in New Jersey
Educational institutions established in 1869
Education in Newark, New Jersey
Girls' schools in New Jersey
Middle States Commission on Secondary Schools
Private high schools in Essex County, New Jersey
Roman Catholic Archdiocese of Newark
Catholic secondary schools in New Jersey